Rihards Veide (born 1 November 1991) is a Latvian BMX racer. He qualified for the 2012 Summer Olympics in London, finishing in 7th place in the final. Veide has won the bronze medal at 2011 European Championships. He was born in Valmiera, Latvia.

References

External links
 
 
 
 
 

1991 births
Living people
BMX riders
Latvian male cyclists
Olympic cyclists of Latvia
Cyclists at the 2012 Summer Olympics
European Games competitors for Latvia
Cyclists at the 2015 European Games
People from Valmiera